Santiago Eneme Bocari (born 29 September 2000) is an Equatoguinean footballer who plays as a midfielder for the National 2 side of French club FC Nantes B and the Equatorial Guinea national team.

Club career
Born in Malabo, Eneme has played club football for Cano Sport Academy in Equatorial Guinea and for the Nantes B reserve team in France.

International career
Eneme made his international debut for Equatorial Guinea in 2018.

Personal life
Eneme's younger brother, Gustavo Melchor Eneme, is also a footballer. His brother has been already called up to the local-based Equatorial Guinea national team.

References

External links

2000 births
Living people
Sportspeople from Malabo
Equatoguinean footballers
Association football midfielders
Equatorial Guinea international footballers
2021 Africa Cup of Nations players
Cano Sport Academy players
FC Nantes players
Championnat National 2 players
Equatoguinean expatriate footballers
Equatoguinean expatriate sportspeople in France
Expatriate footballers in France
Equatorial Guinea A' international footballers
2018 African Nations Championship players